The Dublin Minor Football Championship "A" is a Gaelic Athletic Association competition organised by Dublin GAA between the top teams in minor (under-18) Gaelic football in County Dublin, Ireland. The trophy awarded for the championship is the FitzGerald Cup.

A Championship

Top winners

Roll of Honour

B Championship

C Championship

D Championship

E Championship

F Championship

G Championship

References 

 Hannon’s heroics see Whitehall snatch victory over Boden in MFC ‘A’ decider
 Dublin GAA - Official Website
 Late Lacey goal sees Na Fianna secure MFC ‘A’ title
 Clontarf finish strong to capture Dublin MFC ‘A’
 Na Fianna make it a minor ‘A’ double

External links 
 Official Dublin Website
 Dublin on Hoganstand
 Dublin Club GAA
 Reservoir Dubs
 2007 B Final report

Minor